Opus africanum is a form of ashlar masonry used in Carthaginian and ancient Roman architecture, characterized by pillars of vertical blocks of stone alternating with horizontal blocks, filled in with smaller blocks in between.  

Its name derives from the Roman province of Africa, and is common in North Africa, but also found in Sicily and Southern Italy.

See also
 Roman concrete (opus caementicium) – building material used in construction during the late Roman Republic and the Roman Empire. 
Dougga in Tunisia contains many examples of opus africanum.

References 

Adam, Jean-Pierre (1999). Roman Building. Routledge.  Pages 120–121. 

Bricks
Concrete
Roman construction techniques